HMS Manchester was a Type 42 (Batch 3) destroyer in the 5th Destroyer Squadron of the United Kingdom's Royal Navy. She was laid down in 1978 at Vickers Shipbuilding and Engineering, launched in 1980, commissioned in 1982, and decommissioned on 24 February 2011.

Her nickname was the "Busy Bee", in reference to the Manchester bee symbol and the bee emblem is also depicted on the ship's crest.

Construction and design
Manchester was laid down on 19 May 1978, was launched on 24 November 1980 and commissioned on 16 December 1982.

Manchester was the first of the four Batch 3 Type 42 destroyers. Displacement was  full load.

Service history

Early operations
Manchesters first operational deployment was to the Falkland Islands in 1983/84. During the mid-1980s Manchester participated in the Royal Navy's Global 86 tour where a task group, led by Illustrious, was detached to fly the flag in a round the world cruise and series of port visits.

The ship joined the 5th Destroyer Squadron.

It was whilst on this deployment that the ship was visited by the then UK Prime Minister, Margaret Thatcher, who made a flying visit following her tour of India. The period also coincided with the end of the Iran-Iraq war and shooting down of the Iran Air Flight 655 by the Aegis missile cruiser  on the morning of 4 July 1988.

Gulf War
In 1991, during the First Gulf War, she participated in numerous operations in the Persian Gulf, aimed at primarily upholding the trade blockade imposed on Iraq during Saddam Hussein's invasion of Kuwait. She won the lineage its newest battle honour - Persian Gulf 1991.

Post-Gulf War
In February 2000, Manchester was deployed on Atlantic Patrol Tasking (North) to the Caribbean carrying out counter narcotics operations in concert with RFA Grey Rover and USS Deyo and the US LEDET. Port visits included Key West, Barbados, St Vincent, Trinidad, Curacao, Cartagena, Martinique and New York on her return. Whilst in New York, she was one of several ships hit by the liner Queen Elizabeth 2 whilst berthed alongside the East River.

Manchester returned to the West Indies for second 4-month spell in 2003.

In 2004, Manchester acted in the role of Fleet Ready Escort (FRE). During the deployment Manchester visited a number of ports in the Mediterranean.

In the autumn of 2005, Manchester was deployed in the Mediterranean as part of a NATO task force. During the four-month deployment she was employed in a counter terrorist role alongside other European and American ships.

From 27–30 July 2009, Manchester travelled to Bermuda to help celebrate the British Overseas Territory's 400th anniversary. The crew took part in a historical re-enactment of the wrecking of the sailing ship  on 28 July 1609, which was en route as a rescue supply ship to British colonialists in Virginia at the time.

During this tour, she also visited the Falkland Islands, Brazil and Colombia and spent time in Cape Verde for counter-narcotics training with the local coastguard.  However upon her return to Britain a junior rating was alleged to have attempted to smuggle 12 kilograms of cocaine in bags in her personal quarters.

In 2010 Manchester was on a seven-month deployment to the Caribbean, mainly on counter-drug operations and a display of security to Britain's Overseas Territories in the region. On 15 November 2010, Manchester became the first British warship to visit Havana, Cuba, since  in 1957. Her officers discussed co-operation with the Cuban Navy on counter-drug-trafficking and disaster relief operations in the region. Manchester's visit to Cuba supposedly paved the way for the thawing of US-Cuba relations. This deployment ended in December 2010 and culminated in a £19 million drug bust. Her Caribbean deployment was also the subject of a Channel 5 documentary series entitled Royal Navy Caribbean Patrol broadcast from 7 February 2011 onwards.

On 2 February 2011, Manchester berthed at Liverpool, England, as the city was the nearest to Manchester, the city of her affiliation. The crew hosted a civic reception onboard before parading through the city for their final freedom of the city parade.

Fate

On 21 February 2011, Manchester sailed into her home port of HMNB Portsmouth where she was decommissioned on 24 February 2011.

Affiliations
The Duke of Lancaster's Regiment (King's, Lancashire and Border)
Worshipful Company of World Traders
Manchester City F.C.
Sale R.F.C.
Manchester Trafalgar Sea Cadets

Gallery

Notes

Citations

References

Cold War destroyers of the United Kingdom
Ships built in Barrow-in-Furness
1980 ships
Type 42 destroyers of the Royal Navy
Gulf War ships of the United Kingdom